Cromer Hall is a country house located one mile south of Cromer on Holt Road, in the English county of Norfolk. The present house was built in 1829 by architect William Donthorne. The hall is a grade II* listed building.

Description
Cromer Hall was built in a variant of the Gothic Revival style, dubbed "Tudor Gothic" by architectural historian Nikolaus Pevsner; it is constructed in flint, with stone dressings and a slate roof. Additions were made in 1875. The building has an asymmetrical plan and has sections of two and three storeys. The central three-storey section is crenellated at the parapets with molded copings. The large windows are all of a Gothic design, with large mullions featuring four centered heads and tracery. At the front center is a projecting two-storey section with stepped gable and octagonal tower on the north corner. Projecting from this is an entrance porch with embattled parapet and four-centered-arch doorway. To the north and south ends of the front elevation there are bay windowed gables, each with a round window near the peak of the gable and a corbelled chimney at the apex. The north gabled wing has a bell tower over the roof with battlements and a short spire. The building has many tall octagonal stone chimneys, some single and some in groups. Adjoining the main house to the north east there are a range of buildings which include stables and domestic wing. This section is built behind flint screen wall with three and four centered headed doorways and two stone mullion and transom windows. The entire outside walls are of flint construction, but inside walls facing the courtyard are of brick construction with low-pitched, hipped, slated roofs. The wing also has octagonal chimneys. The rooms have sash windows with glazing bars and there are large four-centered, arch-headed carriageway doors.

Literary connections
The hall has a strong literary connection thanks to a visit to the house by the writer Sir Arthur Conan Doyle, most noted for his stories about the detective Sherlock Holmes. In 1901 Arthur Conan Doyle had returned from South Africa, suffering from Typhoid fever. To aid his recuperation, the author decided to take a golfing holiday in North Norfolk, accompanied by the journalist Bertram Fletcher Robinson. The two friends stayed at the Royal Links Hotel in Cromer. During their stay, Doyle probably heard the Norfolk legend of 'Black Shuck', the Hell Hound of Norfolk. The following description of Baskerville Hall in Doyle's book can also be matched to the exterior aspects of Cromer Hall.

 From The Hound of the Baskervilles by Sir Arthur Conan Doyle, originally serialised in the Strand Magazine from August 1901 to April 1902. Unfortunately, Doyle himself said nothing in his autobiography about the writing of The Hound of the Baskervilles. Although the setting for the story was Devon, Doyle's visit to Cromer undoubtedly provided part of the inspiration.

Occupants
Cromer Hall was bought by Benjamin Bond Cabbell from Lady Listowel (daughter of Admiral Windham) in 1852. He was succeeded at Cromer Hall by his nephew John Cabbell who changed his name to Bond-Cabbell in 1875. He was succeeded by his son, Benjamin Bond-Cabbell, in 1878.

The hall today
Cromer Hall is not open to the public (summer 2010) and the house is still a private residence. The best position from which to view the building is Hall Road, which leads south from Cromer to the village of Felbrigg. It is described at length by the Donthorn expert Roderick O'Donnell in ‘Cromer Hall, Norfolk; the home of the Cabbell-Manners family’, in Country Life Magazine (London, vol 196, no.2, 10 January 2002, pp. [34]-39).

In the summer of 2017, the hall hosted two open-air concerts.

References

Cromer
Country houses in Norfolk
Grade II* listed buildings in Norfolk
Wyndham family residences
Houses completed in 1829
1829 establishments in England